The 34th European Women's Artistic Gymnastics Championships was held from 11–14 August 2022 in Munich, Germany as part of the second multi-sport European Championships.  There were 37 nations who sent athletes.  Athletes from Russia and Belarus were banned due to the Russian invasion of Ukraine.

Schedule

Medals summary

Medalists

Medal standings

Overall

Senior

Junior

Senior results

Team competition 
Oldest and youngest competitors

Individual all-around

All gymnasts took part with no qualification. Scores were taken from team final and individual apparatus qualification session. The following is the top 10 of the individual all-around.

Vault 

Oldest and youngest competitors

Uneven bars 

Oldest and youngest competitors

Balance beam 

Oldest and youngest competitors

Floor 
Oldest and youngest competitors

Junior results

Team competition 
Oldest and youngest competitors

Individual all-around

All gymnasts took part with no qualification. Scores were taken from team final and individual apparatus qualification session. The following is the top 10 of the individual all-around.

Vault 
Oldest and youngest competitors

Uneven bars 
Oldest and youngest competitors

Balance beam 
Oldest and youngest competitors

Floor 
Oldest and youngest competitors

Qualification

Senior

Team competition

Vault

Uneven bars

Balance beam

Floor

Junior

Vault

Uneven bars

Balance beam

Floor

World Championships qualification 
This event served as qualification for the 2022 World Championships in Liverpool.  The top thirteen teams who qualified a full a team to compete were Italy, Great Britain, France, Germany, Belgium, Netherlands, Hungary, Spain, Romania, Finland, Austria, Ukraine, and Sweden.  

The top 23 individuals (max two per country) not part of a qualified team qualified to compete as an individual.  Those individuals were: Lihie Raz (ISR), Camille Rasmussen (DEN), Maria Tronrud (NOR), Lucija Hribar (SLO), Halle Hilton (IRL), Aneta Holasová (CZE), Zala Trtnik (SLO), Thelma Adalsteinsdottir (ISL), Klara Peterkova (CZE), Juliane Toessebro (NOR), Emma Slevin (IRL), Mariana Parente (POR), Valentina Georgieva (BUL), Sevgi Kayisoglu (TUR), Emilia Kulczynska (POL), Ofir Netzer (ISR), Anina Wildi (SUI), Freja Petersen (DEN), Bengisu Yildiz (TUR), Elvira Katsali (GRE), Tatiana Bachurina (CYP), Tara Vella Clark (MLT), and Hildur Gudmundsdottir (ISL).  Additionally, since Great Britain qualified a team, their host spot was reallocated to Petra Furac (CRO).

References 

European Artistic Gymnastics Championships
European Artistic Gymnastics Championships
European Artistic Gymnastics Championships
International gymnastics competitions hosted by Germany
European Artistic Gymnastics Championships
European Artistic Gymnastics Championships
Sport in Munich
European Artistic Gymnastics Championships
2022 European Championships